Civic are a five-piece Australian rock band, formed in 2017 in Melbourne. The band consists of Jim McCullough, Lewis Hodgson, Roland Hvlaka, Jackson Harry and Matt Blach.

They released their debut studio album Future Forecast in March 2021.

History
The idea for the band formed after Jim McCullough and Darcy Grigg were in a bowling alley in Japan in 2016. In 2017, McCullough and Grigg got together with Roland Hvlaka and Louis Hodgson. Shortly after, David Forcier joined and the band was formed. The bands concept was to "do good rock and roll and not to stuff about with it".

Late in 2017 the band gathered into a small radio studio to perform a hustling live set on my radio program Teenage Hate.
 
In April 2018, the band released their debut EP, New Vietnam, which Aine Keogh from Forte Magazine gave 5 out of 5 calling the EP "totally old school rock 'n' roll punk and I don't think they could have done it any better."
 
In November 2018, the band released their second EP, Those Who No. Andy from Raven Sings the Blues said "Not long after their last crackling EP, Civic returns with a follow-up that hits even harder. Where their debut boiled down porto-punk into its grit and grease components, there's a cleanliness and clarity to Those Who No."

On 26 July 2019, the band released their third EP, Selling. Sucking. Blackmail. Bribes on 7-inch EP.

The band released their debut studio album Future Forecast in March 2021, which Tom Breihan from Stereogum said "does not disappoint".

In November 2022, Civic shared details of their second studio album, Taken by Force, which was released on February 10th, 2023. It is the band's first release on Cooking Vinyl Australia.

Band members
Jim McCullough
Lewis Hodgson
Roland Hvlaka 
Matt Blach
Jackson Harry

Discography

Studio albums

Extended plays

References

Musical groups from Melbourne
Musical groups established in 2017
2017 establishments in Australia
Anti Fade Records artists